Everlasting, also known as the Marikina meatloaf, is a Filipino steamed meatloaf originating from Marikina. It is made with ground pork, Chorizo de Bilbao sausages, carrots, bell peppers, raisins, pickle relish, tomatoes, onions, and eggs. It is similar to the hardinera meatloaf of Quezon and is also traditionally steamed in an oval-shaped tin mold known as a llanera (or lyanera).

See also
Morcón
Embutido
 List of pork dishes

References

Philippine pork dishes